Milagros Mumenthaler (born 1977 in La Falda, Argentina) is a film director, and screenplay writer. Born in Argentina and raised in Switzerland, Mumenthaler filmography include two feature-length films and several short films. 
Back to Stay her first feature-length film was a mayor critical success and collected many awards in film festivals all around the world.

Filmography

Awards and nominations

References

External links
 

Argentine film directors
Artists from Buenos Aires
Argentine women writers
1973 births
Argentine screenwriters
Living people
Writers from Buenos Aires
Women screenwriters